Matviienko Pavlo Volodymyrovych (born August 6, 1973, Dnipropetrovsk, Ukrainian SSR, USSR) is a Ukrainian politician and entrepreneur, chairman of the National Economic Development Party of Ukraine (since 03.2001), member of the National Economic Development Party of Ukraine (since 1995), people's deputy of Ukraine of the 4th convocation (2002-2006).

Biography

Early years (1973-1991) 
Matviienko Pavlo Volodymyrovych was born on August 6, 1973 in Dnipropetrovsk in the family of a financier, Ukrainian.

Father Matvienko Volodymyr (1938) — at that time held the position of manager of the Dnipropetrovsk Regional Office of the Budbank of the USSR, mother Matviienko Halyna (1941).

He graduated from secondary school No. 125 in Kyiv, where the family moved permanently in 1979. During his studies, he was actively involved in sports, paying great attention to self-development and self-improvement.

Inspired by the example of his father, who in 1991 was appointed chairman of the Board of the National Bank of Ukraine (NBU), and later became the founder and chairman of the board of Prominvestbank PJSC, decided to connect his life with the economic sphere.

Education (1991-2012) 
In 1995, he graduated from the Faculty of international economic relations of the Kyiv state economic University, now KNEU named after V. Hetman, with a degree in economics with knowledge of a foreign language.

In parallel with studying at KSEU, in 1992-1994 he studied with an in-depth study of professional disciplines at Thames Valley University European and International Studies in the UK ("TVU" London).

In 2004, on the basis of KNEU named after V. Hetman, he defended his PhD thesis on the topic Development of monetary relations in the transformational economy of Ukraine, received the degree of candidate of Economic Sciences in the specialty "Finance, money circulation and loans".

In 2012, he received a bachelor's degree in law, graduating from the Private Higher Education Institution "European University".
He is fluent in Ukrainian, English and Russian.

Banking (1994-2008) 

He started his career in 1994 as an economist in the International Department of Prominvestbank PJSC.

In 1996, he held the positions of chief economist and head of the International Information and Correspondent Relations Department of the Department of international relations, methodology and statistics of the International Department of Prominvestbank PJSC.

In 1997, he was appointed deputy chairman of the management board of National Credit JSCB.

From 1998 to 2002, he was chairman of the Management Board of National Credit JSCB.
In the period from 2006 to 2008, after completing his parliamentary powers, he was appointed chairman of the Supervisory Board of National Credit JSCB.

Political activities (1998-2014) 
In March 1998 he became a candidate for people's Deputies of Ukraine from the party of National Economic Development Party of Ukraine, No. 49 on the list. At the time of the election: member of the National Economic Development Party of Ukraine, Deputy Chairman of the management board of "National Credit" JSCB (Kyiv).

In June 2000 became a candidate for deputy of Ukraine, Electoral District No. 221, Kyiv, took 3rd place out of 13 candidates. At the time of the election: Chairman of the Management Board of "National Credit" JSCB.

People's deputy of Ukraine of the 4th convocation (2002-2006), Electoral District No. 66 of Zhytomyr region, from the party of National Economic Development Party of Ukraine. Received more than 30% of the vote. At the time of the election: Chairman of the Board of "National Credit" JSCB, chairman of the party of National Economic Development Party of Ukraine (NEDPU).

Member of the United Ukraine faction (May–June 2002), member of the European choice group (June 2002-November 2003), member of the Regions of Ukraine faction (November 2003-February 2005), member of the Party of industrialists and entrepreneurs of Ukraine faction (since April 2005).
Member of the Verkhovna Rada Committee on finance and banking (June 2002-May 2006).
In March 2006, he was a candidate for people's Deputies of Ukraine from the National Economic Development Party of Ukraine, No. 1 on the list. At the time of the election: people's deputy of Ukraine, chairman of the National Economic Development Party of Ukraine.
From December 2008-January 2011, and from January 2013-November 2014, he served as an assistant-consultant to the people's deputy of Ukraine.

Chief consultant of the secretariat of the Verkhovna Rada Committee on rules of Procedure, parliamentary ethics and ensuring the activities of the Verkhovna Rada of Ukraine (February 2011-January 2013).

During his parliamentary activity in the Korostenskyi Electoral District No. 66 of the Zhytomyr region, he actively contributed to the development of its infrastructure.

During 2002-2006, about 5 million hryvnias were allocated to help institutions and individual segments of the population, and more than 20 socially significant infrastructure facilities were built in the district.

Family and personal life 
 Father Matviienko Volodymyr (born 1938) is a well-known Ukrainian politician, entrepreneur, artist and philanthropist. Hero of Ukraine, professor, Honored Artist of Ukraine, Chairman of the NBU (1991-1992), chairman of the Management Board of Prominvestbank (until 2008). Author of poetry collections. 
 Mother Matviienko Halyna (born in 1941) is a housewife. 
 Wife Matviienko Nataliia (born in 1975) is an employee of Prominvestbank of Ukraine.
 Daughter Halyna (born in 1997) 
 Son Volodymyr (born in 1998)

He has been married since 1996.

Pavlo Matviienko is of the Christian Orthodox faith, actively participates in charity work and represents the interests of Ukraine at the international level, introducing the world community to the culture and traditions of their native land, drawing attention to its history and socio-political events in which it lives.

Awards 

On December 26, 2003, he was awarded the certificate of honor of the Cabinet of Ministers of Ukraine for his significant personal contribution to the formation of a system of effective and politically responsible government and the implementation of socio-economic reforms.

References

External links 
 VOLODYMYR MATVIIENKO PAVLO MATVIIENKO.BOOK "PROMINVESTBANK:reproduction strategy" // K.NAUKOVA DUMKA, 2002

 [PAVLO MATVIIENKO.BOOK "How to protect Ukraine's independence" // K.NAUKOVA DUMKA, 2006

 PAVLO MATVIIENKO.IVAN POZPUTENKO BOOK "Interpretation of financial and banking English terms" // K.NAUKOVA DUMKA, 2007

 Looking back for the future // Holos Ukrayiny, 10.04.2021

 Ideology of own power // Newspaper Day, 07.03.2001
 

 Among people and with people // Obriy PIB, November of 2002

 Ideology of the National Economic Development of Ukraine // Obriy PIB,12 (40)  Decemder of 2001

 In life and in song, they are inseparable // Obriy PIB,2 (42)  February of 2002

 Surprises for schoolchildren of the Polish region // Obriy PIB,10 (52)  October of 2002

 Pavlo Matvienko. Investment climate in Ukraine // Obriy PIB,11 (39)  November of 2001

 Pavlo Matvienko.Spring is coming, spring is on its way  // Obriy PIB,3 (43)  March of 2002

 Pavlo Matvienko. I believe in the victory of the new seeds // Obriy PIB,9 (37)  September of 2001

 Pavlo Matvienko. I believe in the victory of the new seeds // Obriy PIB,9 (37)  September of 2001

 Pavlo Matvienko. Report of the People's Deputy of Ukraine // Drevlyany krai,1 February of 2003
 Pavlo Matvienko.Suggestions, opinions, problems  // Drevlyany krai,1 February of 2003
 Pavlo Matvienko.Get yourself together  // Obriy PIB,24   July of 2004

 Pavlo Matvienko.To people with an open heart  // Drevlyany krai,14 August of 2004
 Pavlo Matvienko. It is necessary to self-govern in such a way that people thank you // Drevlyany krai,7 December of 2002
 Pavlo Matvienko.I consider it a good sign when young people go into politics // Obriy PIB,7 (23) July of 2000
 https://politmarket.info/pavlo-matviienko-pobalakayteshhob-selya.html Pavlo Matvienko.Chat so that the villagers are not offended] // Drevlyany krai,Summer of 2003
 Pavlo Matvienko.Human greatness in the service of the people  // Drevlyany krai,2010
 [ https://politmarket.info/pavlo-matviienko-golovne-zavdannya-pob.html Pavlo Matvienko.THE MAIN TASK IS TO BUILD A MARKET ECONOMY] //Holos Ukrayiny ,110 (40)  June of 2002

  Pavlo Matvienko.Protect the domestic creditor //Holos Ukrayiny ,197   October of 2002

  Pavlo Matvienko.Conceptual principles of monetary policy of Ukraine //Holos Ukrayiny ,31   February of 2003

 Pavlo Matvienko.A new economic development strategy for Ukraine  // Obriy PIB,31   August of 

 Pavlo Matvienko.Charity is help, not self-promotion  // Obriy PIB,№4   January of 2004

 Pavlo Matvienko.Party tasks  // Obriy PIB,№5    2004

 Pavlo Matvienko.Chernobyl. Ukrainian strategy. Speech at parliamentary hearings // Obriy PIB,№17 April of 2004

 Petro Myhaylov.Under the guardianship of the people's deputy // Obriy PIB,№14 April of 2004

 Pavlo Matvienko.Tasks of PNERU in the New Political Conditions. Report of the Chairman of PNERU at the 6th Extraordinary Congress of the Party // Obriy PIB,№21  2005

 Pavlo Matviienko.Criteria for the functioning of political parties // Obriy PIB,№31  2005

 Pavlo Matvienko.Development of education, science, culture - state support // Obriy PIB,№46 November of 2005

 Pavlo Matvienko.Youth: state, problems and ways to overcome them. Speech at parliamentary hearings // Obriy PIB,№47 December of 2005

 Pavlo Matvienko.The need for economic corrections in Ukraine // Obriy PIB,№39 October of 2005

 Pavlo Matvienko.Greetings from March 8 // Obriy PIB,№9  2006

 Pavlo Matvienko.The tax system is at the service of the Ukrainian people // Obriy PIB,№15 June of 2006

 Pavlo Matvienko.The investment role of domestic banks // Obriy PIB,№51 December of 2005

 Pavlo Matvienko.The concentration of cash flows is at the level of state policy // Obriy PIB,№50 December of 2005

 Pavlo Matvienko What kind of society are we building // Obriy PIB,№33 August of 2005

 Pavlo Matvienko. Reform the pension system // Obriy PIB,№45 October of 2005

 Pavlo Matvienko. Every person has a workplace // Obriy PIB,№42 October of 2005

 Pavlo Matvienko. PNERU for the stabilization of society // Obriy PIB,№28 July of 2005

 Pavlo Matvienko. Reforming the Tax System is an Urgent Need // Obriy PIB,№6  2006

 Pavlo Matvienko. Against the criminalization of local authorities. Party statement // Obriy PIB,№7  2006

 Pavlo Matvienko. We work in the interests of the people. Interview with the Cherkasy Regional State Broadcasting Company // Obriy PIB,№8  2006
 Pavlo Matvienko. We build the future with our own hands // Obriy PIB,№10  2006

 Pavlo Matvienko. From the standpoint of conscience and moral obligation // Obriy PIB,№16  2006

 Pavlo Matviienko. Economic problems of the new government // Obriy PIB,№33  2006

 Pavlo Matviienko. Welcome Speech to the Students of the Kyiv Banking Institute // Obriy PIB,№36  2006

 O.Dunaievska. School bus by Pavlo Matvienko // Obriy PIB,№39  2006

 Pavlo Matvienko.  Capitalization of the Banking System of Ukraine. Speech at the International Summit // Obriy PIB,№6  2007

 Pavlo Matvienko.  We Are Those Who Create Ukraine in Work, Creativity, and Life" Speech before the Congress Delegates // Obriy PIB,№32  2007

 Pavlo Matviienko.  Congratulations on the 16th Anniversary of the Declaration of Independence of Ukraine // Obriy PIB,№33  2007

 Pavlo Matviienko.Pre-election program of PNERU // Obriy PIB,№35  2007

 Pavlo Matviienko.Instead of Bigboard - Good Job! Report of the People's Deputy of Ukraine // Obriy PIB,№35  2007

 Pavlo Matviienko.PNERU is the protection of national interests // Obriy PIB,№36  2007

 Pavlo Matviienko.REAL AFFAIRS OF PNERU Press Conference In Interfax-Ukraine // Obriy PIB,№36  2007

 A.Ivaschuk.Bohdanovka receives Pavel Matvienko // Obriy PIB,№37  2007

 Pavlo Matviienko.A politician must know people // Obriy PIB,№37  2007

 Pavlo Matviienko.For National Economic Unity. Press Conference In Interfax-Ukraine // Obriy PIB,№38  2007

 Pavlo Matviienko.PNERU is a transparent and honest party // Obriy PIB,№38  2007

 Letters to Pavlo Matvienko. The blue gas light reminds of goodness // Obriy PIB,№50  2007

 Kozachenkas are visiting the people of Bilki // Obriy PIB,№6  2008

 Pavlo Matviienko.Domestic banks are the basis of the economic security of the state // Obriy PIB,№15  2008

 Youth in Donetsk. Pavel Matvienko's visit to Bagmut and Mariupol // Obriy PIB,№26  2008

1973 births
Living people
Ukrainian politicians
Kyiv National Economic University alumni
Fourth convocation members of the Verkhovna Rada